Andhra Mess  is 2018 Indian Tamil-language action thriller film directed by Jai and produced by Nirmal K. Bala. The film stars Raj Bharath, Thejaswini, Pooja Devariya, A. P. Shreethar, Mathivanan Rajendran, and Balaji Mohan while Vinoth, R. Amarendran, and Mithra Kurian play supporting roles. The film has music scored by Prashant Pillai. The film was released on 22 June 2018 after being delayed in production for three years.

Plot

Devaraj (Vinod), a gangster, is hired to steal a bag from a house. He delegates this task to his underlings Varadhu (AP Shreethar), Rathna (Raj Bharath), Ritchie (Mathivanan Rajendran), and Sethu (Balaji Mohan). Varadhu, who has just broken up with his girlfriend (who has insulted him for being a nobody), finds out that the bag has crores of cash and decides that this could be his moment to get rich. The criminals scoot away with the bag to a remote village, where they take refuge under Janardhanan (R. Amarendran), an elderly man whose family were once zamindars, along with his wife and Bala (Tejaswini). During their stay, Rathna and Bala begin an affair, and Ritchie's girlfriend Arasi (Pooja Devariya) also enters the scene. She causes a problem between Richie and his gang, causing the couple to break up. Devaraj tracks them down and in a freak accident, becomes paralyzed. Janardhanan dies in a hunting trip, and Bala is united with Rathna. They all start a hotel by the name of Andhra Mess in Janadhanan's property.

Cast
 Raj Bharath as Rathna
 Thejaswini as Bala
 Pooja Devariya as Arasi
 AP Shreethar as Varadhu
 Mathivanan Rajendran as Ritchie 
 Balaji Mohan as Sethu
 Vinoth as Devaraj
 R. Amarendran as Janardhanan
 Aadhira Pandilakshmi as Geetha

Production
Noted artist, AP Shreethar, made his film debut with the venture portraying a negative role. To train him, director Jai arranged a 15-day acting workshop for Sreethar with koothu-p-pattarai. Mathivannan Rajendran made his lead debut with this film although it ended up releasing after Sawaari.

Release 
The Times of India gave the film two out of five stars and wrote that " In the end, despite looking colourful, this Andhra Mess ends up serving us fare that lacks spice". The New Indian Express gave the film a rating of 2.5 out of 5 stars and wrote that "A lot of interesting bits that add up to nothing". Deccan Chronicle gave a similar rating and noted that "Andhra Mess tries to provide a uniquely flavorful experience but comes out forced and undercooked. Directed by ad-filmmaker turned director Jai, this movie is technically all sound, but lacks the synergy to make it work".

References

2010s Tamil-language films
Indian black comedy films
Indian comedy thriller films
2018 action thriller films